In formal language theory, a cone is a set of formal languages that has some desirable closure properties enjoyed by some well-known sets of languages, in particular by the families of regular languages, context-free languages and the recursively enumerable languages. The concept of a cone is a more abstract notion that subsumes all of these families. A similar notion is the faithful cone, having somewhat relaxed conditions. For example, the context-sensitive languages do not form a cone, but still have the required properties to form a faithful cone.

The terminology cone has a French origin. In the American oriented literature one usually speaks of a full trio. The trio corresponds to the faithful cone.

Definition
A cone is a family  of languages such that  contains at least one non-empty language, and for any  over some alphabet ,

The family of all regular languages is contained in any cone.

If one restricts the definition to homomorphisms that do not introduce the empty word  then one speaks of a faithful cone; the inverse homomorphisms are not restricted. Within the Chomsky hierarchy, the regular languages, the context-free languages, and the recursively enumerable languages are all cones, whereas the context-sensitive languages and the recursive languages are only faithful cones.

Relation to Transducers

A finite state transducer is a finite state automaton that has both input and output. It defines a transduction , mapping a language  over the input alphabet into another language  over the output alphabet. Each of the cone operations (homomorphism, inverse homomorphism, intersection with a regular language) can be implemented using a finite state transducer. And, since finite state transducers are closed under composition, every sequence of cone operations can be performed by a finite state transducer.

Conversely, every finite state transduction  can be decomposed into cone operations. In fact, there exists a normal form for this decomposition, which is commonly known as Nivat's Theorem:
Namely, each such  can be effectively decomposed as

Altogether, this means that a family of languages is a cone if and only if it is closed under finite state transductions. This is a very powerful set of operations. For instance one easily writes a (nondeterministic) finite state transducer with alphabet  that removes every second  in words of even length (and does not change words otherwise). Since the context-free languages form a cone, they are closed under this exotic operation.

See also
 Abstract family of languages

Notes

References
 

 
Seymour Ginsburg, Algebraic and automata theoretic properties of formal languages, North-Holland, 1975, .
 John E. Hopcroft and Jeffrey D. Ullman, Introduction to Automata Theory, Languages, and Computation, Addison-Wesley Publishing, Reading Massachusetts, 1979. . Chapter 11: Closure properties of families of languages.

External links
Encyclopedia of mathematics: Trio, Springer.

Formal languages